In geometry, a flat or Euclidean subspace is a subset of a Euclidean space that is itself a Euclidean space (of lower dimension).  The flats in two-dimensional space are points and lines, and the flats in three-dimensional space are points, lines, and planes.

Flats are the affine subspaces of Euclidean spaces, which means that they are similar to linear subspaces, except that they need not pass through the origin. Flats occur in linear algebra, as geometric realizations of solution sets of systems of linear equations.

A flat is a manifold and an algebraic variety, and is sometimes called a linear manifold or linear variety to distinguish it from other manifolds or varieties.

Descriptions

By equations
A flat can be described by a system of linear equations.  For example, a line in two-dimensional space can be described by a single linear equation involving  and :

In general, a linear equation in  variables describes a hyperplane, and a system of linear equations describes the intersection of those hyperplanes. Assuming the equations are consistent and linearly independent, a system of  equations describes a flat of dimension .

Parametric
A flat can also be described by a system of linear parametric equations.  A line can be described by equations involving one parameter:

while the description of a plane would require two parameters:

In general, a parameterization of a flat of dimension  would require parameters .

Operations and relations on flats

Intersecting, parallel, and skew flats
An intersection of flats is either a flat or the empty set.

If each line from one flat is parallel to some line from another flat, then these two flats are parallel. Two parallel flats of the same dimension either coincide or do not intersect; they can be described by two systems of linear equations which differ only in their right-hand sides.

If flats do not intersect, and no line from the first flat is parallel to a line from the second flat, then these are skew flats. It is possible only if sum of their dimensions is less than dimension of the ambient space.

Join
For two flats of dimensions  and  there exists the minimal flat which contains them, of dimension at most . If two flats intersect, then the dimension of the containing flat equals to  minus the dimension of the intersection.

Properties of operations
These two operations (referred to as meet and join) make the set of all flats in the Euclidean -space a lattice and can build systematic coordinates for flats in any dimension, leading to Grassmann coordinates or dual Grassmann coordinates. For example, a line in three-dimensional space is determined by two distinct points or by two distinct planes.

However, the lattice of all flats is not a distributive lattice.
If two lines  and  intersect, then  is a point. If  is a point not lying on the same plane, then , both representing a line.

Euclidean geometry
The aforementioned facts do not depend on the structure being that of Euclidean space (namely, involving  Euclidean distance) and are correct in any affine space. In a Euclidean space:
 There is the distance between a flat and a point. (See for example Distance from a point to a plane and Distance from a point to a line.)

 There is the distance between two flats, equal to 0 if they intersect.

 There is the angle between two flats, which belongs to the interval  between 0 and the right angle. (See for example Dihedral angle (between two planes). See also Angles between flats.)

See also
 N-dimensional space
 Matroid
 Coplanarity
 Isometry

Notes

References
 Heinrich Guggenheimer (1977) Applicable Geometry,page 7, Krieger, New York.
 From original Stanford Ph.D. dissertation, Primitives for Computational Geometry, available as DEC SRC Research Report 36 .

External links

Euclidean geometry
Affine geometry
Linear algebra

fr:Hyperplan